The sandy sprat, Hyperlophus vittatus, also known as the glassies, glassy, white pilchard, or whitebait, is a type of sprat fish.

Footnotes

Hyperlophus
Fish described in 1875